Mehrma (also spelled Meharma) is a village in Meharama CD block in Godda subdivision of Godda district in the Indian state of Jharkhand.

Geography

Location                                              

Overview
Rajmahal coalfield is shown in the map. The entire area is overwhelmingly rural with only small pockets of urbanisation.

Note: The full screen map is interesting. All places marked on the map are linked and you can easily move on to another page of your choice. Enlarge the map to see what else is there – one gets railway links, many more road links and so on.

Demographics
According to the 2011 Census of India, Mehrma had a total population of 2,358, of which 1,226 (52%) were males and 1,132 (48%) were females. Population in the age range 0–6 years was 419. The total number of literate persons in Mehrma was 837 (43.17% of the population over 6 years).

Civic administration

Police station
Mehrma police station serves Meharama CD block.

CD block HQ
Headquarters of Meharama CD block is at Mehrma village.

Education
Project Girls High School is a Hindi-medium girls only institution established in 1981. It has facilities for teaching in classes IX and X.

References

Villages in Godda district